This is a list of Nuttall mountains in England by height.  Nuttalls are defined as peaks above  in height, the general requirement to be called a "mountain" in the British Isles, and with a prominence above ; a mix of imperial and metric thresholds.

The Nuttall classification was suggested by Anne and John Nuttall in their 1990 two–volume book, "The Mountains of England and Wales". The list was updated with subsequent revised editions by the Nuttalls. Because of the prominence threshold of only , the list is subject to ongoing revisions. This was the prominence threshold that the UIAA set down in 1994 for an "independent" peak. However, both the Nuttall and Hewitt classifications have become popular with peak baggers, and both remain in use, and their respective authors maintain up to date lists, as does the Database of British and Irish Hills.

 there were 257 in England. The first people registered as climbing all of the Nuttalls were Anne and John Nuttall themselves, in March 1990. On 16 September 2017, James Forrest completed all 446 Nuttalls in six months.

Coverage of Nuttalls

The table below of 257 English Nuttalls at October 2018, include:

Nuttall mountains in England by height

Data is from the Database of British and Irish Hills ("DoBIH") in October 2018, and are peaks DoBIH marks as English ("E" and "ES"), and Nuttalls ("N").  John and Anne Nuttall update the list of Nuttalls from time to time, and the DoBIH also updates their measurements as more surveys are recorded, so these tables should not be amended or updated unless the entire DoBIH data is re-downloaded again.

Bibliography

DoBIH codes

The DoBIH uses the following codes for the various classifications of mountains and hills in the British Isles, which many of the above peaks also fall into:

Ma	Marilyn
Hu	HuMP
Sim	Simm
5	Dodd
M	Munro
MT	Munro Top
F	Furth
C	Corbett
G	Graham
D	Donald
DT	Donald Top
Hew	Hewitt
N	Nuttall
Dew	Dewey
DDew	Donald Dewey
HF	Highland Five
4	400-499m Tump
3	300-399m Tump (GB)
2	200-299m Tump (GB)
1	100-199m Tump (GB)
0	0-99m Tump (GB)
W	Wainwright
WO	Wainwright Outlying Fell
B	Birkett
Sy	Synge
Fel	Fellranger
CoH	County Top – Historic (pre-1974)
CoA	County Top – Administrative (1974 to mid-1990s)
CoU	County Top – Current County or Unitary Authority
CoL	County Top – Current London Borough
SIB	Significant Island of Britain
Dil	Dillon
A	Arderin
VL	Vandeleur-Lynam
MDew	Myrddyn Dewey
O	Other list (which includes):
 Bin Binnion
 Bg Bridge
 BL Buxton & Lewis
 Ca Carn
 CT Corbett Top
 GT Graham Top
 Mur Murdo
 P500 P500
 P600 P600
Un	unclassified

suffixes:
=	twin

See also

List of mountains of the British Isles by height
Lists of mountains and hills in the British Isles
Lists of mountains in Ireland
List of Munro mountains in Scotland
List of Murdos (mountains)
List of Furth mountains in the British Isles
List of Marilyns in the British Isles
List of P600 mountains in the British Isles

Notes

References

External links
The Database of British and Irish Hills (DoBIH), the largest database of British Isles mountains
Hill Bagging UK & Ireland, the searchable interface for the DoBIH
Nuttalls.com, the website of Anne and John Nuttall
The Relative Hills of Britain (rhb.org.uk), a website dedicated to mountain and hill classification
Simms: RBH Portal for Alan Dawson's work on Simms (and Hewitts)

Nuttalls
 
Lists of mountains and hills of England